Midnight Horror School is a Japanese computer-animated anime series created by Naomi Iwata (who also created Pecola and Gregory Horror Show), and produced by Milky Cartoon. The series began in October 2003 until March 2004, and aired on the satellite network Animax. The series also aired on Spacetoon Indonesia under the "Comedy Planet" block.

Characters and setting
The school has 26 students, 3 teachers, 3 classrooms, a library, a cafeteria, a music room, a playroom, a fountain, a skeleton playground, a graveyard and several school staff. The students names all start with a letter of the alphabet, which they all have on their shirt. They are all also assigned a color.

Students

Ampoo (Voiced By Chiyako Shibahara): A quiet plug boy. He's a mature student, but when charged up, his personality changes drastically. When charged, the electricity he produces becomes dangerous. Ampoo often pairs up with his best friend Watt to emit light through the latter's head. He is also close with Magnero as he helps him detect metal. He can operate machinery by plugging his head through an outlet. His color is purple.
Borocca (Voiced By Junji Majima): A shy umbrella boy. He's often called "Plain" by other students, and goes mostly unnoticed due to this. Although he's shy, he's shown to be an overall kind-hearted and nice person towards the other characters. When he gets excited, his umbrella head opens and closes. Though he's a nice person, he can get upset very easily. When he cries, it rains, which in this case he can make the school become a downpour. His color is aquamarine.
Chaps (Voiced by Mochizuki Hisayo): An optimistic and excitable half-melted candy girl. She's kind, positive, very energetic, and sometimes to points that can slightly be annoying to her classmates. She's very nice and friendly towards almost anyone, and, as seen in Memories Day, even went out of her way to save one of Yumyum's flies (the Spy Fly) that bullied her when it got stuck in a spider web, even befriending it in the process. She seems mostly friendly with Juno, but interacts with almost every student in the school. She doesn't seem to like Yumyum, half of the time. When she tries to do too many things at once, she melts. Her color is light green.
Docky (Voiced by Mayumi Tanaka (Season 1) and Takeshi Kusao (Season 2): A skeleton that wears a firefighter hat with the number 13 on his head. As shown throughout the series, Docky can be considered a bit arrogant and conceited due to his pride over his wonder, which, as shown in "Strange Scribbles", sometimes annoys his fellow classmates. However, he is also a very dependable character, and tries to help out whenever he's needed for something. As stated in his official description, many of the other boys are a bit envious of him due to both his wonder and his speed when sliding down the banister of the staircase in the school. He's one of the more mature students in the school, and he takes pride in this fact. He's admired greatly by Quicky, and the two are often seen as good friends. Girls look at him with a curious eye. His color is red.
Enton (Voiced by Tarusuke Shingaki): A brick chimney boy. He's very quiet and shy, rarely interacts with the other students, and can get a bit upset. But he had switched opposites with Docky in the episode "Speedstar E", in which Docky becomes shy while Enton becomes very speedy. When he gets excited, he puffs smoke, which confuses most of them. His color is brown.
Fonton: A fountain pen boy who often leaks ink. He's completely silent throughout the entire series, and his only dialogue comes from words and drawings he draws on pieces of paper. He's an overall friendly student, and seems very eager to help whenever he's needed for something. His color is light yellow.
Genie (Voiced by Ryuzou Ishino): A book sleeve boy who loves to study and wears glasses. With the book he has normally put into his head, he's very smart, and has the personality of a stereotypical nerdy character. He enjoys reading, science, mathematics, and other academic subjects. However, without the book (which acts sort of like his brain) in his head, he completely spaces out and is unable to think. By putting any book other than his normal one into his head, he gains a personality that matches the subject of the book itself, like when Spimon put a book about samba dancing into Genie's head which made him start to dance around. His color is green.
Hikky (Voiced by Hiromi Otsuda): A two-sided pencil boy, and the main protagonist of the series. He really loves to draw. He gets along with mostly every other student in the school, and, being the protagonist of the series, acts as the leader of certain events that occur. Although he's the most common target for Tubee, Usop, and Yumyum's constant bullying, he's not afraid to take a stand against them. He has 2 colors: Red and dark blue. The two different colors represent two different personalities as seen in the episode "Red Hikky, Blue Hikky", with red representing both headstrong and rudeness, and blue representing both shyness and sadness.
Inky: A blue ink bottle boy. He's a bit shy, but is willing to lend a helping hand whenever needed. He speaks in a slow, sluggish manner, and is one of the least popular students. He can get easily flustered, and, whenever this happens, the blue ink inside of his head starts to turn hot pink and will gush out, making his head fully empty and causing him to die. He's good friends with Fonton, and the two are often seen together. He also has a crush on Liddy, in fact, every time he sees her, he turns red and sometimes his ink comes out of his bottle. Juno's head plant seems to have an odd obsession with him, hitting him on the head when it sees him. Inky's ink can work similar to a love potion, but only when drawing a heart with it and thinking about said crush. It can be assumed the ink can have other properties in different situations. His color is baby blue.
Juno (Voiced by Tomoe Hanba): A flower pot girl who always carries around a man-eating plant on her head. Juno has a sort of big sister personality, being very protective of her friends, especially in the case of Rosso. She's very nice, and cares a lot about the well-being of the students and even the staff of the school. However, whenever she needs to be, she can get aggressive and serious when it means protecting herself or her friends. In these situations, the man-eating plant on her head gets violent. She has 2 colors: Salmon pink and dark green.
Kabo (Voiced By Tomoko Kawakami): A pumpkin boy. He is the son of a pumpkin king and is very likable. Kabo normally does not speak, but instead makes giggling noises when he's happy. He's sort of mysterious, but in almost all of his appearances in the show, he's very joyful and friendly towards the other students at the school (even with Yumyum, Usop and Tubee, who helped him with gathering coins for his pumpkin plant in "Kabo's Part Time Job", and called Genie and Vincent out when they tried to curve his behavior in "Day of the Great Pumpkin"). However, Kabo can be a mischievous person at times, something Genie and Vincent in particular don't seem to be very fond of. His color is orange.
Liddy (Voiced by Tomoko Kawakami): A keyboard instrument girl, and the secondary protagonist of the series. She's a kind-hearted, outgoing, and friendly student. She is very popular around the school, even to the point where multiple other students have crushes on her. However, she can get feisty easily, and doesn't usually hesitate to speak her mind. She plays the organ and is very good at music. Yumyum has a crush on her. As the secondary protagonist of the series, she can act as a leader often, but not always as much as in the case of Hikky. She has 2 colors: Pink and red.
Magnero (Voiced by Setsuji Satoh): A magnet boy who always has a scrap metal stuck to him. Magnero is a shy student and, due to this, is not super popular in the school. However, he's very kind to people who reach out and try to be his friend. He is very interested in the arts and building machines, with his wonder even being based on this fact. His color is gray.
Noisy (Voiced by Tomoe Hanba): A microphone girl. As her name implies, Noisy is very loud and not afraid to speak her mind. Being the news anchor for the school's daily news show called "Midnight Eye", she's constantly on the lookout for new stories and gossip around the school, much to the dismay and annoyance of her peers. However, she never tries to be intentionally malicious for any reason and tries to be friendly with everyone in the school, even if her attempts don't always work out the greatest. As seen in the episode "Noisy Noisy" she has a crush on Tubee. Her color is pale purple.
Onpoo (Voiced by Sakiko Tamagawa): A music note girl. She's a cheerful and kind-hearted student. She's very friendly with everyone at the school, especially with Liddy. She loves to sing and will often be seen singing in episodes of the show. While singing, music notes come out from her body and make harp tunes. Her name means "music note" in Japanese. Due to her head being a purely-black music note, she lacks any stitching on her, and all her facial features are pure white, making her the least monstrous-looking student. Her color is Black.
Piranin: A fish boy, which also resembles a piranha who is always ill. He's shy, quiet, and a bit of a pessimist at times. He doesn't have the most confidence in himself, which is sometimes used as a plot point in episodes like "Dash! Desk Race" or "The Ferocious Beast Piranin". Despite this though, he's very friendly with many of his classmates, most notably with Hikky, Liddy, and Spimon. He enjoys swimming around in the school fountain. His color is olive green.
Quicky (Voiced By Hiroko Emori (Season 1) and Takeshi Kusao (Season 2) : A clock boy. As his name implies, Quicky is very fast paced and often in a hurry. He's very energetic and cheerful, a stark contrast from the reserved and mostly calm demeanor of his best friend Docky. He helps Docky time his personal banister-slide time trials, as well as time the actual banister-slide contests. He has 2 colors: tan and orange.
Rosso: A shy fire hydrant boy. Rosso is a shy student who has the habit of getting upset easily. As shown in the episode "Rosso the Crybaby", when he gets upset, water starts to shoot out of the holes in his head. Although he doesn't talk to other students much due to his shyness, he's very friendly with Juno. He loves to water Juno's plant, but gets nervous about watering things around anyone else. Yumyum, Tubee, and Usop bully him a lot. His color is red.
Spimon: A loudspeaker boy who also resembles a monkey. He's extremely energetic and friendly and, being a loudspeaker during the day, is slightly loud at times. He's very good friends with Hikky, Liddy, and Piranin, and the four of them are often seen together. When not with those three, however, he's usually with Noisy, who uses him as a speaker during events and to occasionally broadcast news. Despite this, Spimon seems to have a negative relationship with Noisy, Onpoo, and sometimes even Liddy, as him being used as a speaker by them seems to be mostly against his wil; as it hurts his ears, which sometimes knock him unconscious. He has 2 colors: Light green and yellow.
Tubee (Voiced By Chiyako Shibahara): A paint tube boy, and one of the three main antagonists of the series. He can be oftentimes mean to his peers. He is a troublemaker who always drips paint everywhere. He, along with Usop and Yumyum, could be seen as school bullies, making fun of their classmates and, for the most part, being pretty mean spirited. He tries everything he can to get Hikky angry. However, as shown in a few episodes of the show, Tubee also has a soft side that mostly comes out when he isn't around Usop and Yumyum. Whenever Borocca starts to cry, Tubee attempts to calm Borocca down, which he usually fails. Tubee has a crush on Noisy. He has 2 colors: White and purple.
Usop: A spray paint can boy, and one of the three main antagonists of the series. Usop is oftentimes rude and mean to his fellow students. He, along with Tubee and Yumyum, are often presented as the school bullies. Occasionally, however, he can be shown to be a nice person if the episode plot calls for it. His color is beige.        
Vincent: A quiet jar of jellybeans. Like Inky, Vincent's head is a bottle, but instead of ink, his head is full of jellybeans instead of ink. Vincent is known for losing himself in daydreams, and enjoys to read. He's one of the quieter students in the school, preferring to spend his time alone then hanging out in a crowd. His color is lavender.
Watt: An incandescent light bulb boy. He's cheerful and energetic, being the more playful one compared to his best friend Ampoo. The two often are seen together, as Ampoo is the one that gives Watt the energy to light up. He's very friendly, and seems to get along with most of the students of the school easily. His light burns out when given too strong an electrical charge. He has 2 colors: White and blue.
Mr. X: A transfer student with a paper bag over their head, which they never take off. Mr. X is a mysterious figure, who never speaks other than occasional laughter. Because they don't talk, not much is known about them by the other students of the school, which has occasionally been made into the main plot point in a few of the episodes. Their color is tan.
Yumyum (Voiced by Ryusei Nakao): A mischievous rotten banana boy with his head being shaped like a banana, and one of the three main antagonist of the series. He's a rude, stereotypical bully, who doesn't have a filter when it comes to insulting his classmates. The most common target for his bullying is Hikky, who he often makes fun of for his unperfected wonder. However, around Liddy, Yumyum becomes easily flustered due to an unrequited crush he has on her. He cares deeply for his friends Usop and Tubee, although he isn't shy to be blunt about his negative opinions on them if they mess up something. Whenever the banana inside of his head falls out, he becomes anxious and worried very easily, and will immediately go chasing after whatever or whoever took it to get it back. His color is yellow.
Zobie: A zombie boy. He's a bit of an introvert, rarely interacting with the other students unless against his will. He tends to sleep in his coffin hugging his plushie and sometimes in the graveyard. He is, however, well known to hoard what most would consider "junk" in his locker and seems to be very protective of everything in his possession, risking his life if needed just to get any stolen items back. This habit is often commented on by the other students and seems to be what he's known for best. However, he was possessed by Count Boroso Jiki in the episode "Shigiwosuitorufu" where he stole all students' wonders except for Mr. X. His color is blue.

School staff

Old Owl Sage: A wise old owl who knows everything about the school. He lives in a birdcage by the fountain.
Lure the Fisherman: A lizard skeleton fisherman in charge of the elevators of the school. He is almost always asleep.
Mr. Showtime: A hologram and master of the ceremonies. His catchphrase is "It's show time!"
Eddy the Skeleton Dragon: A dragon skeleton used as a jungle gym, called "Bone Hill" by the students. His skull is also often used for secret meetings.
Johnny Crow: A crow skeleton. He always starts rumors. Whenever the banana inside Yumyum's head comes outside of him completely, Johnny Crow often takes the banana with him, resulting in Yumyum, Tubee and Usop all going after him.
Screwsnail (Nejimakitsumuri): A freak skeleton who winds the clock on the second floor. He is always slow.
Mr. Salaman: A salamander skeleton and one of the 3 teachers. He is affectionate and moody. His students love him but he's a nag. He's the teacher of the Yellow Lizard class.
Mr. Tigerl: A saber tooth tiger skeleton and one of the 3 teachers. He also has a loud roar that scares people. He is very sensitive and likes to read romance novels. He's the teacher of the Blue Spider class.
Ms. Peginand: A penguin skeleton and one of the 3 teachers. She feels a strong rivalry. Ms. Peginand is the only female teacher of the school. She's the teacher of the Pink Toad class.
The Principal: The principal of the school. No one knows what he looks like or where he is.

Other Characters

Casey: An eraser boy who settles in school and erases the children 's graffiti without knowing them. Whenever he is using his power, his body gets more smaller, eventually causing him to disappear. He had a friendly relationship with Hikky.

Classes

The Yellow Lizard Class: One of the 3 classes in the school. This class is seen a lot in the series. The class's teacher is Mr. Salaman and its students are Piranin, Hikky, Liddy, Spimon, Kabo, Tubee (the bully of this class), Docky, Borocca and Zobie.
The Blue Spider Class: One of the 3 classes in the school. This is the scariest class in the series. The class's teacher is Mr. Tigerl and its students are Chaps, Ampoo, Juno, Inky, Watt, Fonton, Usop (the bully of this class), Magnero and Mr. X.
The Pink Toad Class: One of the 3 classes in the school. This is the only class in the school with a female teacher. The class's teacher is Ms. Peginand and its students are Rosso, Noisy, Genie, Onpoo, Quicky, Vincent, Enton and Yumyum (the bully of this class).

References

External links
 Project Midnight Horror School (official website) (Archived)
 
 

2003 anime television series debuts
Japanese children's animated television series
Japanese computer-animated television series
Animax original programming
Anime with original screenplays